Frédéric Neyrat (born 1968) is Associate Professor in Comparative Literature at University of Wisconsin-Madison . He is a French philosopher with an expertise in environmental humanities and contemporary theory. He was Program Director at the Collège international de philosophie in Paris and was also a fellow at Cornell's Society for the Humanities. He is a member of the editorial board of the review Multitudes and Lignes. Website: https://atoposophie.wordpress.com/

Bibliography 

 Fantasme de la communauté absolue. Lien et déliaison, Paris, L'Harmattan, 2002.
 L'image hors-l'image, Paris, Éditions Leo Scheer, « Manifeste », 2003.
 Surexposés : le monde, le capital, la terre, Paris, Lignes manifestes, 2005.
 L'indemne. Heidegger et la destruction du monde, Paris, Sens et Tonka, « Collège international de philosophie », 2008.
 Biopolitique des catastrophes, Paris, Éditions MF, 2008.
 Instructions pour une prise d'âmes. Artaud et l'envoûtement occidental, Strasbourg, Ed. La Phocide, 2009.
 Le terrorisme. Un concept piégé, Alfortville, Éditions è®e, 2011 (réédition de: Le terrorisme. La tentation de l'abîme, Paris, Larousse, coll. « Philosopher », 2009).
 Clinamen. Flux, absolu et loi spirale, Alfortville, Éditions è®e, 2011.
 Le communisme existentiel de Jean-Luc Nancy, Nouvelles Editions Lignes, 2013.
 Atopies. Manifeste pour la philosophie, Éditions Nous, 2014.
 Homo Labyrinthus. Humanisme, antihumanisme, posthumanisme, Éditions Dehors, 2015.
 La part inconstructible de la Terre. Critique du géo-constructivisme, Éditions du Seuil, 2016.
 Atopias. Manifesto for a Radical Existentialism, Fordham University Press, 2017.

References

External links 

 }

1968 births
Living people
Continental philosophers
21st-century French philosophers
Political philosophers
French male non-fiction writers